The Megyeri Bridge, previously known as the Northern M0 Danube bridge, is a cable-stayed bridge that spans the River Danube between Buda and Pest, respectively the west and east sides of Budapest, the capital of Hungary. 
It is an important section of the M0 ringroad around Budapest.

The bridge cost 63billion forints ( 300M) to build and was officially opened on September 30, 2008; however, the National Transport Authority of Hungary has only issued temporary permits because of disagreement among suburban cities surrounding the bridge.

An online naming poll to determine the new name of the recently built bridge caused controversy and received media attention when American comedians Stephen Colbert and Jon Stewart won.

Gallery

Technical information

The total length of the bridge is 1862m. 
Structurally it is composed of five parts:

Left quayside inundation area bridge: 148m
Main Danube-branch bridge (cable stayed): 590m with a span of 300m
Szentendre Island inundation area bridge: 559m
Szentendre Danube-branch bridge: 332m
Right quayside inundation area bridge: 218m

Naming poll
The Ministry of Economic Affairs and Transport of Hungary organized a public vote online to solicit possible names for the new bridge. The three names with the most votes, as well as suggestions from local governments, cartographers, linguists and other experts, were to be reviewed by a government committee before a final name for the bridge was chosen. New nominations were accepted until August 21, 2006, and the voting ended on September 8, 2006.

On August 1, 2006, Reuters reported that the top candidate according to the online poll was the "Chuck Norris híd", named for American action star Chuck Norris. (Chuck Norris facts reached the height of their popularity around this time.) On August 9, 2006, American satirist Stephen Colbert discussed the story on his comedy program The Colbert Report, instructing his viewers to visit the polling website and vote for him instead of Norris. The next day the number of votes for him had grown 230 times, and he now asked his viewers to follow a link from his own "Colbert Nation" website, to avoid "all that illegible Hungarian". Colbert's site also indirectly offered techniques for "stuffing the ballot box", as users of their forums created several automated scripts to cast multiple votes for Colbert. On August 15, 2006, he repeated his call to be voted top of the Hungarian poll, and by August 22, 2006, the "Stephen Colbert híd" was in first with 17 million votes, about 14 million votes ahead of the second-placed Zrínyi híd, named after the Croatian-Hungarian national hero, Miklós Zrínyi, and about 7 million more than the entire population of Hungary. The same day, the site announced a new round of voting, which would require registration to participate, and Colbert asked his viewers to "call off the dogs", requesting on his website that fans stop using scripts to vote. Despite this, the "Stephen Colbert híd" remained in the top position on the website in the second round.

On September 14, 2006, András Simonyi—the ambassador of Hungary to the United States—announced on The Colbert Report that Stephen Colbert had won the vote.  Unfortunately for Colbert, Ambassador Simonyi declared that under Hungarian law, Colbert would have to be fluent in Hungarian, and would have to be deceased in order to have the bridge named for him. However, after saying the rules could most likely be bent, he invited Colbert to visit Hungary and view the construction in person and gave him a Hungarian passport and a 10,000 HUF Bill, with an approximate value of, as the ambassador put it, 'fifty dollars, fifty good US dollars'. Colbert promptly tried to bribe him with said money.

Results

Megyeri Bridge 

On September 28, 2006, it was announced that the bridge will be named "Megyeri Bridge", even though that name did not make it to the second round. The Hungarian Geographical Name Committee justified the final name by explaining that the bridge connects Káposztásmegyer and Békásmegyer.

See also
List of crossings of the Danube River

References

External links

Google Earth 3D model of the bridge
Megyeri híd - pictures and articles 
Photos of Budapest bridges
Bloomberg article
Computer generated video of the Northern M0 Danube bridge
Index.hu article 
Public transport map of Budapest (with bridges) 
Bridges of Budapest - Megyeri Bridge
Aerial photographs of the bridge

Cable-stayed bridges in Hungary
Bridges in Budapest
Bridges over the Danube
Bridges completed in 2008
Internet memes